The British Railways Class D3/7 is a class of 0-6-0 diesel electric shunting locomotives built as LMS Nos. 7080–7119. The class were built from May 1939 through to July 1942 by the London, Midland and Scottish Railway at their Derby Works using a diesel electric transmission supplied by English Electric.

The D3/6 had two axle-hung traction motors instead, and this feature became commonplace in more modern designs built after World War II.

Design
The locomotives are built to the specifications of LMS CME W.A. Stanier for general and hump shunting at the company's Derby Works using engine and electric equipment supplied by the English Electric Company.

Powertrain
The engine and generator are supported on girders attached to the main frame via a three-point suspension with rubber vibration absorbing pads; the generator is to the rear of the engine. The locomotive body is compartmentalised, with side doors and a sliding roof allowing access. Cooling is by a front-mounted radiator, with belt-driven fan cooling.

The main generator is a  direct current machine. Main control was via notched engine speed control (350, 465, 590, and 680 rpm), with finer control via secondary lever. The engine is fitted with a governor preventing overspeed, and electric overload protection.

The locomotive's mechanical transmission consists of a single, frame-mounted traction motor powering a jackshaft drive via a reduction gear; the jackshaft drives all three driving axles via connecting rod and coupling rods. The locomotive is unusual in that most other English Electric diesel shunters (e.g. British Rail Class D3/6) have two axle-hung traction motors.

The locomotive has an inner main frame similar to steam engine practice, with the axles supported by springs attached to the frame by tensioned rods, the centre axle had  side play. The jackshaft is mounted in horn guides with the reduction gear totally enclosed on the left side of the locomotive.

Auxiliaries
An 80-volt battery is used to energise the main generator, as well as powering the electric control system and lights, and is also used to start the engine with the generator in motor mode. The battery is automatically charged when the engine is idling. An air compressor is powered via a belt drive from the generator. Compressed air operates the Westinghouse double-wheel tread brakes, as well as the sanding equipment and the whistle.

History and numbering
Initially 20 of the type were ordered on Lot 141 with a number of the new design put into operation at Toton sidings by mid 1939. An order for a further 20 units was placed on Lot 156 in 1939. These forty locomotives were given LMS numbers 7080–7119.

Ten (7100–7109) were loaned to the War Department in 1941, and sold to the WD the following year. All ten survived the war; six were then sold to Egyptian Railways and four to Italian State Railways (Ferrovie dello Stato—FS) where they were matriculated as Class Ne.700.

The other 30 stayed remained in Britain and later became British Railways numbers 12003–12032. One, 12030 was withdrawn in 1964, with the remainder withdrawn during 1966/67, before TOPS classes were allocated.

Preservation
Although none of the British or Egyptian locomotives survive, two Italian examples survive - 700.001 (formerly LMS No. 7103) and 700.003 (Ex LMS No. 7106). 700.001 was sold to industry in 1984 and preserved later on, and is on display at the Museo Ferroviario Piemontese. 700.003 now resides at Bibbiena station in the Arezzo province.

See also
LMS diesel shunters

References

External links

 Photo of 12031
 Photos of in the Italian FS livery

London, Midland and Scottish Railway locomotives
War Department locomotives
D003.07
C locomotives
Railway locomotives introduced in 1939
Standard gauge locomotives of Great Britain
Diesel-electric locomotives of Great Britain